Local authority leaders' boards are voluntary regional associations of council leaders that have been established in England outside of Greater London to replace certain functions of the now abolished regional chambers. The establishment of the boards was part of the UK Government's Review of Sub-National Economic Development and Regeneration. which brought forward the Government's plans to alter the structure of regional governance in England and was mandated by the Local Democracy, Economic Development and Construction Act 2009. In June 2010, the new Conservative-LibDem coalition government announced plans to remove funding from the new boards and to remove their statutory functions. It was indicated that the boards might continue as voluntary associations of council leaders.

The remaining four areas of the UK have similar voluntary or mandated associations: London Councils, the Welsh Local Government Association, the Convention of Scottish Local Authorities and the Northern Ireland Local Government Association.

The local authority leaders' boards

The leaders' boards are:
East of England Local Government Association
East Midlands Councils
Association of North East Councils (closed in March 2016)
North West Regional Leaders Board
South East England Councils
South West Councils
West Midlands Councils
Local Government Yorkshire and Humber (closed in March 2015)

Each leaders' board corresponds to a region of England.

Structure and functions

When the regional chambers were abolished, their executive functions transferred to the regional development agencies, and their scrutiny functions became exercised by the new leader's boards. The RDA and the leader's board were to jointly produce a new Single Regional Strategy, with ministers exercising an oversight function.

The UK Government did not propose a set structure for the boards and each region was free to make its own arrangements. The Government however did aim for the boards to be:

 streamlined and manageable, able to make strategic, long-term decisions;
 representative of local authorities across the whole of their region — including representing key sub-regions, upper and lower tier authorities and the political balance of leaders;
 composed of local authority leaders and with sufficient authority to act on behalf of all the local authorities in the region.

Withdrawal of funding
In June 2010, the new Conservative-LibDem coalition government announced its intentions to abolish regional strategies and return spatial planning powers to local government. These plans include the withdrawal of funding to the existing eight local authority leaders' boards with their statutory functions also being assumed by local councils. The boards may continue to exist as voluntary associations of council leaders, funded by the local authorities themselves. They continue to exist as regional groupings of the Local Government Association.

See also
Regional development agency
Regional spatial strategy
Historical and alternative regions of England
List of England-related topics

References

External links
Regional Groupings - from the LGA

 
Regional planning in England
Regionalism (politics) in the United Kingdom